The 2010 Caribbean Cup (also known as Digicel Caribbean Cup 2010 for sponsorship reasons) was the 2010 edition of the Caribbean Championship, an international football championship for national teams affiliated with the Caribbean Football Union (CFU) of the CONCACAF region. The final stage was hosted by Martinique. Martinique were selected as hosts over fellow bidders Guadeloupe and Barbados. The competition was originally scheduled to begin on 18 August with the final match taking place on 28 November. However, at the beginning of August 2010, the CFU released a different schedule that showed the competition being postponed until 2 October. Also, the Bahamas pulled out of the competition, leaving 23 teams. The groups were changed, allowing Cuba and Antigua and Barbuda to get a bye to the second qualifying round at the expense of Guyana and the Netherlands Antilles.

The top four teams qualified for the 2011 CONCACAF Gold Cup.

Participants
A total of 23 entered into the tournament. Aruba had initially entered but withdrew shortly before the tournament began, dropping the total from the initial 24 entrants. Seven CFU teams – Aruba, Bahamas, Bermuda, French Guiana, Sint Maarten, Turks and Caicos Islands, and United States Virgin Islands – did not enter, meaning two more participants than in the 2008 edition. Martinique and Jamaica were given byes into the tournament proper as hosts and title holders, respectively. The six highest-ranking teams – Grenada, Guadeloupe, Cuba, Haiti, Trinidad and Tobago, and Antigua and Barbuda – based on the results of the 2008 tournament, were given byes into the second qualifying round. All remaining entrants – Anguilla, Barbados, British Virgin Islands, Cayman Islands, Dominica, Dominican Republic, Guyana, Montserrat, Netherlands Antilles, Puerto Rico, Saint Kitts and Nevis, Saint Lucia, Saint Martin, Saint Vincent and the Grenadines, and Suriname – were drawn into the first qualifying round.

Qualification

The qualifying competition for the 2010 Caribbean Championship was held from 2 October to 14 November 2010 to determine the qualifying teams for the final tournament. 21 teams competed, with six qualifying to join hosts Martinique and title holders Jamaica. The competition was played over two rounds, with the second through seventh highest-ranked teams from the 2008 Caribbean Championship given byes to the second round.

Squads

At least 30 days prior to the tournament, all teams competing in the final tournament were required to provide a provisional list of between 20 and 30 players. 10 days prior, the teams were required to finalize a list of 20 players for the tournament.

Group stage
The final round was contested in Martinique from 26 November – 5 December. It consisted of two groups of four, and the top two teams from each group progressed to the semifinals. Jamaica and Martinique automatically qualified for the final group stage as title holder and host, respectively.

Group H

Group I

Knockout phase

Semi-finals

Third Place Playoff

Final

Goalscorers
3 goals
 Kithson Bain
 Dane Richards

2 goals

 Gayson Gregory
 Roberto Linares
 Jean-Luc Lambourde
 Marvin Morgan, Jr.
 Luton Shelton

1 goal

 Jaime Colomé
 Reysander Fernández
 Yénier Márquez
 Grégory Gendrey
 Ludovic Gotin
 Loïc Loval
 Dwain Jacobs
 Omar Cummings
 Shaun Francis
 Ryan Johnson
 Troy Smith
 Eric Vernan
 José-Thierry Goron
 Hughton Hector

References

External links
Caribbean Football Union
Digicel Caribbean Cup
Digicel Football

 
2010
2010–11 in Caribbean football
International association football competitions hosted by Martinique
2010 in Martinique